Sassy Sue is a 1973 American comedy film directed by Bethel Buckalew and produced by Harry H. Novak. The film's music was composed by Harold Hensley and Hal Southern.

Cast
 John Tull as Junior
 Colleen Brennan as Dolly Lee
 Patrick Wright as Pa 
 Tallie Cochrane as Dottie Lou
 Harvey Shain as Hutch
 Rachel Wolfe as Ma

References

External links
 
 

1973 films
1973 comedy films
American comedy films
1970s English-language films
1970s American films